The canton of Villiers-Saint-Georges is a French former administrative division, located in the arrondissement of Provins, in the Seine-et-Marne département (Île-de-France région). It was disbanded following the French canton reorganisation which came into effect in March 2015. It consisted of 19 communes, which joined the canton of Provins in 2015.

Demographics

Composition 
The canton of Villiers-Saint-Georges was composed of 19 communes:

Augers-en-Brie
Beauchery-Saint-Martin
Beton-Bazoches
Cerneux
Chalautre-la-Grande
Champcenest
Courchamp
Courtacon
Léchelle
Louan-Villegruis-Fontaine
Les Marêts
Melz-sur-Seine
Montceaux-lès-Provins
Rupéreux
Saint-Martin-du-Boschet
Sancy-lès-Provins
Sourdun
Villiers-Saint-Georges
Voulton

See also
Cantons of the Seine-et-Marne department
Communes of the Seine-et-Marne department

References

Villiers Saint Georges
2015 disestablishments in France
States and territories disestablished in 2015